Vito Scalia (May 13, 1925 – October 8, 2009) was an Italian Christian Democrat politician. He served in the Chamber of Deputies of Italy in Legislature II (1953–1958), Legislature III (1958–1963), Legislature IV (1963–1968), Legislature V (1968–1972), Legislature VII (1976–1979) and Legislature VIII (1979–1983). He served in the cabinet of Prime Minister Cossiga (1979–1980).

References

External links
Scheda sul sito della Camera dei deputati

1925 births
2009 deaths
Politicians from Catania
Christian Democracy (Italy) members of the Chamber of Deputies (Italy)
Government ministers of Italy
Deputies of Legislature II of Italy
Deputies of Legislature III of Italy
Deputies of Legislature IV of Italy
Deputies of Legislature V of Italy
Deputies of Legislature VII of Italy
Deputies of Legislature VIII of Italy